Chris Shaw (born 1961) is an English documentary photographer.

Career
Shaw studied at West Surrey College of Art & Design (now University for the Creative Arts) from 1986-89.

Shaw works with independent publishers and he has created small editions of several photographic series including: Retrospecting Sandy Hill (2015), Life as a Night Porter (2006), Weeds of Wallasey (2012), horizon icons (2015), Tokyo in HK (with Tokyo Rummando, 2017), and The Hunter Gets Captured By The Game (2019).

In his 2006 monograph Life as a Night Porter, Shaw published photographs taken over a ten-year period whilst working as a night porter at certain London hotels, "all the time he kept his camera with him, recording in black and white grainy photographs the many strange events that he witnessed, taking pictures." In 2004 Alexander McQueen and Nick Knight chose the pictures as the winning entry in an Independent on Sunday fashion photography competition.

In The Hunter Gets Captured By The Game "we are amid the vibrant nightlife of a Thai holiday resort".

Writing in The Daily Telegraph, journalist John Preston said, "Shaw remains an evasive, almost blurry character who seems to belong in the shadows and who can't bear being stuck in one place for too long."

His working practice is mostly negative based, and heavily worked hand printed archival fibre-based black and white or colour prints. He believes in a physical contact between the materials and the photographer that produces them to form a photograph. His subjects range from night life to Landscape.

Publications

Publications by Shaw
Life as a Night Porter. Santa Fe, NM: Twin Palms, 2006. . Edition of 2000 copies.
Before And After Night Porter. Heidelberg, Germany: Kehrer, 2012. .
Weeds of Wallasey. Kamakura, Japan: Super Labo, 2013. . Edition of 500 copies.
Retrospecting Sandy Hill. London: Morel, 2015. . Edition of 500 copies.
Horizon Icons. London: ADAD, 2015. . Edition of 500 copies
Sohollondon. London: Morel, 2018. . Edition of 250 copies.
Tokyo in Hong Kong. Hong Kong: Zen Photo Gallery, 2018. . Edition of 500 copies.
The Hunter Gets Captured by the Game. Hong Kong: Zen Photo Gallery, 2019. . Edition of 500 copies.
Golden Bitch. Paris: Inbetween Gallery / Shaw, 2019. . Edition of 250 copies.

Publications with others
Far East Obsession. Hiroshi Onishi, 2015. By Mark Pearson, Shaw and Tokyo Rumando. Edition of 500 copies.

Exhibitions
Life as a Night Porter, Perm Museum of Contemporary Art, Perm, Russia. Part of the photo festival in Perm, 2012.
Before and After Night Porter, Tokyo Photo, 2011. Exhibited as a guest of Tate museum and curator Simon Baker.
Life as a Night Porter and Weeds of Wallasey, Moscow House of Photography, Multimedia Art Museum, Moscow, May–June 2014
Chris Shaw and Moriyama: Before and After Night, Tate Britain, London, 2013/14. Shaw's Life as a Night Porter, Sandy Hill Estate and 'Weeds of Wallasey as well as photographs by Daidō Moriyama.Weeds of Wallasey, Exposure, Format International Photography Festival, Derby, UK, 2015. Shaw with Alex F. Webb, David Fathi, Francesca Seravalle, Marianne Bjørnmyr, Boris Eldagsen, George Miles, Karl Ohiri, and others.Night Porter,'' agnès b. gallery, Paris, 2016

Collections
Shaw's work is held in the following permanent collections:
Carnegie Museum of Art, Pittsburgh, PA
Tate, London: 72 prints (as of June 2018)
J. Paul Getty Museum, Los Angeles, CA
Archive of Modern Conflict, London
Wilson centre, Hampstead, London
FRAC, for NANTES, France

References

External links

TateShots: Chris Shaw — Shaw describing his photography and an exhibition (video)
Chris Shaw: “Life as a Night Porter” (2006) at American Suburb X

Photographers from Hampshire
Living people
Monochrome photography
Documentary photographers
1961 births